Soosaar is an Estonian surname, meaning "swamp (bog) island". It may refer to:

Albert Soosaar (1906–1995), clergyman
Eduard Soosaar (1911–1979), clergyman
Enn Soosaar (1937–2010), translator, critic, columnist and publicist
Kaia Soosaar (born 1993), long jumper
Mark Soosaar (born 1946), film director and politician
Marti Soosaar (born 1977), decathlete
Martti Soosaar (born 1933), journalist and writer
Sven-Erik Soosaar (born 1973), linguist

Estonian-language surnames